Rudnicki (feminine: Rudnicka; plural: Rudniccy) is a Polish-language toponymic surname derived from one of places named Rudnica. The Russian-language equivalent is Rudnitsky, Lithuanian: Rudnickis

It may refer to:

 Adolf Rudnicki (1912–1990), Polish essayist
 Icchak Rudnicki, birth name of Yitzhak Arad (1926–2021), Israeli historian, former director of Yad Vashem
 John Rudnicki (born 1951), American professor in engineering
 Klemens Rudnicki (1897–1992), Polish general
 Konrad Rudnicki (1926–2013), Polish astronomer
 Lidia Rudnicka (born 1960), Polish-American dermatologist
 Mikołaj Rudnicki (1881–1978), Polish linguist
 Szymon Rudnicki (born 1938), Polish historian
  (1909–1982) Polish writer

See also
 
 
 Edmond Roudnitska

Polish-language surnames
Polish toponymic surnames